Cassius Clay (soon Muhammad Ali) fought a ten-round boxing match with Charlie Powell in Pittsburgh on January 24, 1963. Clay won the bout by knocking out Powell in the third round.

References

Powell
1963 in boxing
January 1963 sports events in the United States